Arlinda Rushiti (born 27 March 1999) is a Swiss–Kosovar female tennis player.

Rushiti has a career-high singles ranking by the WTA of 352, achieved on 9 January 2023.

Playing for Kosovo Fed Cup team, she has a career win/loss record of 13–13.

ITF finals

Singles: 2 (0–2)

Doubles: 1 (0–1)

External links
 
 
 
 

1999 births
Living people
Swiss female tennis players
Kosovan female tennis players
Swiss people of Kosovan descent